The Allison Peninsula is a narrow ice-covered peninsula that extends into the Bellingshausen Sea from Ellsworth Land, Antarctica. It forms the east margin of the Venable Ice Shelf. It was mapped by the United States Geological Survey from surveys and U.S. Navy air photos (1961–1966). It was named by the Advisory Committee on Antarctic Names for Commander Paul Allison, U.S. Navy, Plans Officer, U.S. Naval Support Force, Antarctica, 1967 and 1968.

References

Peninsulas of Ellsworth Land